Shinjuku, Tokyo held a local election for the city assembly on April 22, 2007 as part of the 2007 Japanese unified local elections.

Election results 

|-
! style="background-color:#E9E9E9;text-align:left;" |Parties
! style="background-color:#E9E9E9;text-align:right;" |Votes
! style="background-color:#E9E9E9;text-align:right;" |%
! style="background-color:#E9E9E9;text-align:right;" |Seats
|-
| style="text-align:left;" |Liberal Democratic Party (自由民主党, Jiyū Minshutō)
| style="text-align:right;" | 23,018
| style="text-align:right;" | 
| style="text-align:right;" | 10
|-
| style="text-align:left;" |New Komeito Party (公明党, Kōmeitō)
| style="text-align:right;" | 19,806
| style="text-align:right;" | 
| style="text-align:right;" | 9
|-
| style="text-align:left;" |Japanese Communist Party (日本共産党, Nihon Kyōsan-tō)
| style="text-align:right;" | 15,642
| style="text-align:right;" | 
| style="text-align:right;" | 8
|-
| style="text-align:left;" |Democratic Party of Japan (民主党, Minshutō)
| style="text-align:right;" | 10,990
| style="text-align:right;" | 
| style="text-align:right;" | 5
|-
| style="text-align:left;" |New Socialist Party (新社会党, Shin-Shakaitō)
| style="text-align:right;" | 2,358
| style="text-align:right;" | 
| style="text-align:right;" | 1
|-
| style="text-align:left;" |Social Democratic Party (社民党 Shamin-tō)
| style="text-align:right;" | 2,108
| style="text-align:right;" | 
| style="text-align:right;" | 1
|-
| style="text-align:left;" | Independents
| style="text-align:right;" | 8,216
| style="text-align:right;" | 
| style="text-align:right;" | 4
|-
|style="text-align:left;background-color:#E9E9E9"|Total (turnout 40.15%)
|width="75" style="text-align:right;background-color:#E9E9E9"| N/A
|width="30" style="text-align:right;background-color:#E9E9E9"| 100.00
|width="30" style="text-align:right;background-color:#E9E9E9"| 38
|-
| style="text-align:left;" colspan=4 |Source: 
|}

See also
2003 Shinjuku local election

Local elections in Japan
Shinjuku
2007 elections in Japan
April 2007 events in Japan
2007 in Tokyo